is a private university based in Tokyo, Japan.

The university originated in a school of law, Tōkyō Hōgakusha (i.e. Tokyo association of law), established in 1880, and the following year renamed Tōkyō Hōgakkō (i.e. Tokyo school of law). This was from 1883 headed by Dr. Gustave Boissonade, and was heavily influenced by the French legal tradition. It merged in 1889 with a school of French studies, Tōkyō Futsugakkō (i.e. Tokyo French school), that had been founded three years earlier. It adopted the name Hosei University (Hōsei daigaku, i.e. university of law and politics) in 1903 and was recognized as a private university in 1920.

Other notable figures involved in its foundation include Dr. Masaaki Tomii, and Dr. Ume Kenjirō, "Father of the Japanese Civil Code".

In addition, Hosei University belongs to Tokyo Big6 Baseball League. The league is one of the most traditional college sports leagues in Japan. 
Hosei University is popular for high school students, ranking 2nd in the number of applicants among Japanese universities in 2017 and 2018 (122,499). Hosei University ranked 100 at Global Executives 2013 top 100 by The Times Higher Education.

Hosei has three main campuses, which it calls Ichigaya, Koganei, and Tama. The Ichigaya campus is halfway between Ichigaya and Iidabashi stations in central Tokyo; its 26-story Boissonade Tower, completed in 2000, can be seen from either station. The campus has a city flavour but is still somewhat isolated from central Tokyo; the nearby presence of Yasukuni Shrine also contributes.

Sciences are studied at the Koganei campus to the west of Tokyo, and other subjects are split between Tama (located in Machida, which is near Hachiōji), and Ichigaya.

Faculties

Ichigaya

 Faculty of Law (Hōgakubu)
 Faculty of Letters (Bungakubu)
 Faculty of Business Administration (Keieigakubu)
 Faculty of Intercultural Communication (Kokusai-bunka-gakubu)
 Faculty of Sustainability Studies (Ningen-kankyō-gakubu)
 Faculty of Lifelong Learning and Career Studies (Kyaria-dezain-gakubu)
 Faculty of Engineering and Design (Dezain-kōgakubu)
 Faculty of Global and Interdisciplinary Studies (GIS, Gurōbaru-kyōyō-gakubu) (from 2008)
 Institute of Global and Interdisciplinary Studies (IGIS, Gurōbaru-gakusai-kenkyū-insutityūto)
 Sports Science Institute (SSI, Supōtsu-saiensu-insutityūto)
 Graduate School of Humanities (Jinbun-kagaku-kenkyūka)
 Graduate School of Economics (Keizaigaku-kenkyūka)
 Graduate School of Law (Hōgaku-kenkyūka)
 Graduate School of Politics (Seijigaku-kenkyūka)
 Graduate School of Sociology (Shakaigaku-kenkyūka)
 Graduate School of Business Administration (Keieigaku-kenkyūka)
 Graduate School of Policy Sciences (Seisaku-kagaku-kenkyūka)
 Graduate School of Environmental Management (Kankyō-manejimento-kenkyūka)
 Graduate School of Intercultural Communication (Kokusai-bunka-kenkyūka)
 International Japan-Studies Institute (Kokusai-nihongaku-insutityūto)
 Law School (Hōka-daigakuin)
 Business School of Innovation Management (Inobēshon-manejimento-kenkyūka)

Tama
 Faculty of Economics (Keizaigakubu)
 Faculty of Social Sciences (Shakaigakubu)
 Faculty of Social Policy and Administration (Gendai-fukushi-gakubu)
 Graduate School of Social Well-Being Studies (Ningen-shakai-kenkyūka)

Koganei
 Faculty of Engineering (Kōgakubu) (being phased out)
 Faculty of Science and Engineering (Rikōgakubu) (from 2008)
 Faculty of Bioscience and Applied Chemistry (Seimeikagakubu) (from 2008)
 Faculty of Computer and Information Science (Jōhōkagakubu)
 Graduate School of Engineering (Kōgaku-kenkyūka)
 Graduate School of Computer and Information Science (Jōhōkagaku-kenkyūka)

Notable people

Alumni
Mizuhito Akiyama, author
Chiho Aoshima, artist
Mew Azama, model and actress
Satoshi Dezaki, anime director
Yukihiro Doi, racing cyclist
Shu Fujisawa, author
Sadayoshi Fukuda, philosopher and critic
Takuya Honda, football player
Tomoko Hoshino, actress
Norihiro Inoue, actor
Kenji Goto, journalist and writer
Kairi Hojo, professional wrestler
Kosuke Ito, politician
Mitsuaki Iwagō, photographer
Hideo Jinpu, politician
Yukio Jitsukawa, politician
Emi Kaneko, politician
Hiroh Kikai, photographer
Shin Kishida, actor*
Hiroto Kōmoto, singer*
Aki Maeda, actress
Masao Maruyama, film producer
Michiko Matsumoto, photographer
Shinpei Matsushita, politician
Takayuki Mikami, karateka
Kyohei Morita, rugby player
Katsuhito Nakazato, photographer
Kinoko Nasu, author
Kouhei Kadono, author
Yuka Sato, figure skater
Midori Sawato, film narrator
Yoshihide Suga, politician
Haruka Takachiho, author
Kazunori Tanaka, politician
Tadashi Wakabayashi, baseball player
Yōsuke Yamahata, photographer*
Taku Yamamoto, politician
Yoshio Yatsu, politician
Shuichi Yoshida, novelist
Yasumi Matsuno, video game creator*
Hu Han Min
Shōgo Yano, voice actor
* dropped out before graduation
Nishida Hiroki, Volleyball Player

Faculty
Sadateru Arikawa
Faubion Bowers
Shu Fujisawa
Sadayoshi Fukuda
Kojin Karatani
Shunji Karube
Kiyozō Kazama
Ume Kenjirō
Ōmi Komaki
Taro Kono
Samezō Kuruma
Ryokichi Minobe
Shūmei Ōkawa
Mitsukuri Rinsho
Ishimoda Shō
Fujisawa Shu
Morita Sōhei
Hiroshi Takahashi
Jūji Tanabe
Hyakken Uchida
Tetsuro Watsuji

Popular perception
Hosei university is regarded as comparable with the Tokyo-area private universities Meiji, Aoyama Gakuin, Rikkyo, and Chuo, collectively called "MARCH".

It has an entrance examination difficulty level that is in the top 10 for a private university in Japan.

Sports
The university's baseball team plays as one of the Tokyo Big6 Baseball League.

Partner universities
Boston University
Baylor University
University of California, Davis
University of California, San Diego
Michigan State University
California State University, East Bay
Truman State University
University of Nevada, Reno
Boise State University
San Jose State University
Fontbonne University
San Diego State University
Southern California Institute of Architecture
University of Illinois
Gustavus Adolphus College
West Chester University of Pennsylvania
University of Wisconsin–Milwaukee
Minnesota State University, Mankato
Medaille College
Portland State University
Westfield State University
University of Utah
George Mason University

Peking University
School of Government, Peking University
School of Humanities and Social Sciences, Tsinghua University
School of Social Sciences, Tsinghua University
University of Science and Technology of China
Shanghai Jiao Tong University
Wuhan University
Xiamen University
University of Science and Technology Beijing
Beijing Normal University
Capital Normal University
Shanghai International Studies University
Northeastern University (China)
State Administration of Foreign Experts Affairs
Chongqing Normal University
China Foreign Affairs University
Xi'an Jiaotong University
Beijing Jiaotong University
Beijing Foreign Studies University
Minzu University of China
Beijing Center for Japanese Studies
Shandong University of Finance and Economics
Dalian Nationalities University
Sichuan International Studies University
Liaoning University, College of International Relations
Fuzhou University
Dalian University of Foreign Languages
Software College of Jilin University
Xidian University
Huazhong University of Science & Technology
School of Software, Central South University

Indian Institute of Science

Sanata Dharma University
Bogor Agricultural University
Institute of Technology Sepuluh Nopember

Samarkand State University

Yonsei University
Duksung Women's University
Sungkonghoe University
Seoul National University
Gachon University
Korea University
University of Seoul
Ewha Womans University
Inha University
Sungshin Women's University
Hankuk University of Foreign Studies
Chung-Ang University
Konkuk University
Kyonggi University
Busan University of Foreign Studies
Hoseo University

Thammasat University
Chulalongkorn University

Mekelle University

Institute of Oriental Studies of the Russian Academy of Sciences
Moscow State University
Saint Petersburg State University
Petersburg State Transport University
National Research University – Higher School of Economics
Penza State University

University of AlgiersRoyal Holloway, University of London
University of Sheffield
University of Reading
The University of Nottingham
University of Glasgow
University of Leeds
Newcastle University
University of Sussex
University of Bradford
The University of York
Birkbeck, University of London
University of Wolverhampton

University of Sydney
Griffith University
The University of Adelaide
Monash University
James Cook University
Bond University
Australian Catholic University

Massey University
The University of Auckland

University of British Columbia
University of Alberta
University of Toronto
Brock University
York University
Trent University
University of Prince Edward Island
University of Victoria

University College Dublin
University of Limerick

Ho Chi Minh City University of Technical Education
University of Social Sciences and Humanities - VNU

National Sun Yat-sen University
Tamkang University
Wenzao Ursuline University of Languages
Chung Yuan Christian University
National Formosa University
National Yunlin University of Science and Technology
National Kaohsiung Normal University
Shih Chien University
National Taiwan Normal University
National Chengchi University

Cambodian Mekong University
Royal University of Phnom Penh

National University of Laos

Asia Pacific University of Technology & Innovation
University of Malaya
University of Technology, Malaysia
UCSI University
Universiti Teknologi MARA

Polytechnic University of Milan
University Carlo Cattaneo
Ca' Foscari University of Venice

University of Vienna

Swiss Federal Institute of Technology
University of St. Gallen
University of Zurich

University of Barcelona
Institut Ramon Llull

Czech Technical University in Prague

Humboldt University of Berlin
University of Oldenburg
Leuphana University of Lüneburg
Baden-Württemberg Cooperative State University
University of Bremen
Stuttgart Technology University of Applied Sciences

Corvinus University of Budapest

Pantheon-Sorbonne University
Jean Moulin University Lyon 3
Catholic University of the West
Versailles Saint-Quentin-en-Yvelines University
Sciences Po Saint-Germain-en-Laye
Aix-Marseille University
University of Strasbourg
University of Toulouse II – Le Mirail

National University of La Plata

Universidad Anáhuac México Norte
University of Guadalajara

References

External links
  Official site
 Official site
 History of Hosei University

 
Private universities and colleges in Japan
American football in Japan
Kantoh Collegiate American Football Association Top 8 university
Shinjuku
Chiyoda, Tokyo
Koganei, Tokyo
Machida, Tokyo
1880 establishments in Japan
Educational institutions established in 1880
Universities and colleges in Tokyo